The Battle of Hwangsanbeol (Hangul: 황산벌 전투, Hanja: 黃山伐戰鬪) took place between the forces of Silla and Baekje in Hwangsanbeol (currently Nonsan) in 660.

By the time King Muyeol was able to gain the support of Emperor Gaozong of Tang China to conquer Baekje. King Uija had led Baekje into demise as his parties and dissipation caused neglect for state affairs. In 660, Gim Yu-sin of Silla set out with fifty-thousand troops to rendezvous with the Tang army (size about: 122,711 to 130,000 men) which was being shipped over the sea. When King Uija heard of this crisis, he had already lost support from his ministers and only managed to rally five thousand men. He quickly appointed General Gyebaek as the commander of the armed forces, and sent him out to face Gim Yu-Sin in battle. 

The Baekje army arrived at Hwangsanbeol first. Gyebaek set up camp and rallied his troops with a heroic speech. He reminded the soldiers of the armies of antiquity when Goujian defeated a seven hundred-thousand force with a mere five thousand. With this speech, the Baekje forces regained their strength, and prepared for a face off with the Silla forces. 

Gim Yu-Sin soon arrived, and the Silla forces attempted a full attack on the Baekje forces. However, fighting to the death, the Baekje forces soon repelled the enemy, repulsing them five times. The Silla forces gradually lost morale, and the General Gim Pumil sent his young son and Hwarang, Gwanchang, to single-handedly go out and fight the enemy. Gwanchang was captured by the Baekje forces at first and was released by Gyebaek. The young hwarang then returned to the Silla base only to once again charge out at the enemy. Gyebaek captured him once more, and because he respected his young enemy, he executed Gwan Chang and sent his body to the Silla base.

Through Gwanchang's martyrdom, the Silla forces' morale returned and Gim Yu-sin ordered a full attack on the dwindling Baekje forces. In the end, Gim Yu-Sin's Silla forces won and Gyebaek died in battle. Gim later stated that his enemy was a man of honor and bravery. 

As this battle was the last Baekje resistance to Silla/Tang forces, Baekje soon fell when Gim Yu-Sin and the Chinese general So Jung-Bang surrounded Gongju and King Uija surrendered.

Modern depiction
The 5,000 Baekje army was defeated by a 50,000 Silla army led by General Gim Yu-sin. There is a Korean comedy/war film about this battle, called Once Upon a Time in a Battlefield, starring Park Joong-hoon and Jung Jin-young. There is also a Korean Drama called Gyebaek (TV series) and Queen Seondeok (TV series) that touch on the life's of Gim Yu-Sin and Gye Baek leading to the war and subjugation of Baekje.

During the Baekje festival held in Buyeo and elsewhere, there was a re-enactment in 2008 of the battle that was done at the park in Nonsan along the river.

References

Hwangsanbeol
History of South Chungcheong Province
660
7th century in Korea